Constantinos Daskalakis (born 29 April 1981) is a Greek theoretical computer scientist. He is a professor at MIT's Electrical Engineering and Computer Science department and a member of the MIT Computer Science and Artificial Intelligence Laboratory. He was awarded the Rolf Nevanlinna Prize and the Grace Murray Hopper Award in 2018.

Early life and education
Daskalakis was born in Athens on 29 April 1981. His grandparents originated from Crete, where he summered as a child. He has a younger brother, Nikolaos. When Daskalakis was in third grade, his father bought an Amstrad CPC, which Daskalakis stayed up all night attempting to learn how it worked.

He attended Varvakeio High School, and completed his undergraduate studies in the National Technical University of Athens, where in 2004 he received his Diploma in Electrical and Computer Engineering. He completed his undergraduate thesis "On the Existence of Pure Nash Equilibria in Graphical Games with succinct description" under the supervision of Stathis Zachos. As an undergraduate, Daskalakis attained perfect scores in all but one of his classes, something which had not previously been achieved in the university's history.

He continued to study at University of California, Berkeley, where he received his PhD in Electrical Engineering and Computer Science in 2008 under the supervision of Christos Papadimitriou. His thesis was awarded the 2008 ACM Doctoral Dissertation Award.

Research and career
After his PhD he spent a year as a postdoctoral researcher in Jennifer Chayes's group at Microsoft Research, New England.

Daskalakis works on the theory of computation and its interface with game theory, economics, probability theory, statistics and machine learning. 

He has resolved long-standing open problems about the computational complexity of the Nash equilibrium, the mathematical structure and computational complexity of multi-item auctions, and the behavior of machine-learning methods such as the expectation–maximization algorithm. He has obtained computationally and statistically efficient methods for statistical hypothesis testing and learning in high-dimensional settings, as well as results characterizing the structure and concentration properties of high-dimensional distributions.

Daskalakis co-authored The Complexity of Computing a Nash Equilibrium with his doctoral advisor Christos Papadimitriou and Paul W. Goldberg, for which they received the 2008 Kalai Game Theory and Computer Science Prize from the Game Theory Society for "the best paper at the interface of game theory and computer science", in particular "for its key conceptual and technical contributions"; and the outstanding paper prize from the Society for Industrial and Applied Mathematics (SIAM).

He was appointed a tenured Professor at MIT in May 2015.

Awards and honors
Constantinos Daskalakis was awarded the 2008 ACM Doctoral Dissertation Award for advancing our understanding of behavior in complex networks of interacting individuals, such as those enabled and created by the Internet. His dissertation on the computational complexity of Nash Equilibria provides a novel, algorithmic perspective on game theory and the concept of the Nash equilibrium. For this work Daskalakis was also awarded the 2008 Kalai Prize for outstanding articles at the interface of computer science and game theory, along with Christos Papadimitriou and Paul W. Goldberg.

In 2018, Daskalakis was awarded the Nevanlinna Prize for "transforming our understanding of the computational complexity of fundamental problems in markets, auctions, equilibria and other economic structures". He also received the Simons Foundation Investigator award in Theoretical Computer Science, an award designed for "outstanding scientists in their most productive years," who are "providing leadership to the field".

He was named to the 2022 class of ACM Fellows, "for fundamental contributions to algorithmic game theory, mechanism design, sublinear algorithms, and theoretical machine learning".

References

1981 births
Living people
Greek computer scientists
MIT School of Engineering faculty
Nevanlinna Prize laureates
Greek emigrants to the United States
Scientists from Athens
National Technical University of Athens alumni
Fellows of the Association for Computing Machinery